Sodo may refer to:
 Sodo, a town and separate woreda in south-central Ethiopia
 SoDo, Seattle, Washington, United States
 SODO (Link station), a light rail station in SoDo, Seattle
 Sōdō Station, a train station in Shimotsuma, Ibaraki Prefecture, Japan
 Soddo (woreda), in the Gurage Zone, SNNPR, Ethiopia
 Soddo language, a Gurage language spoken in southeastern Ethiopia
 O-Ie Sōdō, noble family disputes within the samurai and aristocratic classes of Japan
 Saut-d'Eau, a municipality in the Centre department of Haiti